Jonathan Tan (born 11 March 2002) is a Singaporean swimmer. He represented Singapore at the 2019 World Aquatics Championships held in Gwangju, South Korea and he finished in 34th place in the heats in the men's 50 metre freestyle event.

Education 
In 2022, Tan enrolled Stanford University, California, United States on a partial scholarship.

Swimming career 
In 2018, he represented Singapore at the Asian Games held in Jakarta, Indonesia and he competed in one individual event and two relays events. He finished in 14th place in the heats in the men's 200 metre freestyle event. He won the bronze medal both in the men's 4 × 100 m freestyle relay and men's 4 × 200 m freestyle relay events.

During the 16th Singapore National Swimming Championships Invitationals in 2021, Tan broke his own national record for the men’s 50m freestyle with 22.12 seconds and qualified for the 2021 Southeast Asian Games (SEA Games). However, it was 0.1 second slower than the required 22.02 seconds to qualify for the 2020 Summer Olympics held in Japan. Tan would also qualify for both 50m and 100m freestyle events for the 2021 SEA Games. Tan won the men's 200m freestyle event with 1 min 50.17 seconds but failed to qualify for both 2021 SEA Games and the 2020 Summer Olympics.

References 

Living people
2002 births
Place of birth missing (living people)
Singaporean male freestyle swimmers
Swimmers at the 2018 Asian Games
Asian Games medalists in swimming
Asian Games bronze medalists for Singapore
Medalists at the 2018 Asian Games
Competitors at the 2021 Southeast Asian Games
Swimmers at the 2022 Commonwealth Games
Commonwealth Games competitors for Singapore
Southeast Asian Games gold medalists for Singapore
Southeast Asian Games silver medalists for Singapore
Southeast Asian Games bronze medalists for Singapore
Southeast Asian Games medalists in swimming
21st-century Singaporean people